U.S. Route 322 (US 322) is a  long, east–west United States Highway, traversing Ohio, Pennsylvania, and New Jersey. The road is a spur of US 22 and one of the original highways from 1926. A portion of it at one time was concurrent with the Lakes-to-Sea Highway.

Route description

|-
|OH
|62
|99
|-
|PA
|370
|595
|-
|NJ
|62
|99
|}

Ohio
US 322 begins at the intersection of Superior Avenue and East Roadway at Public Square in Downtown Cleveland, just northeast of the junction of U.S. Routes US 6, US 42, and State Route 3 (Superior Avenue) with US 422 and State Route 8, State Route 14, State Route 43, and State Route 87 (Ontario Street). East of Public Square, the route runs eastward through midtown Cleveland conjoined with US 6 along Superior Avenue. Northwest of Cleveland State University, US 322 turns south onto 13th Street and runs eastward (as Chester Avenue) through Playhouse Square. Exiting the commercial district, US 322 interchanges Interstate 90, at exit 173. In University Circle, US 322 is briefly concurrent with U.S. Route 20 (Euclid Avenue). The overlap terminates at the eastern edge of University Circle, where US 322 splits off to the south by southwest, becoming Mayfield Road as it enters Little Italy, and through the eastern suburbs of Cleveland Heights, South Euclid, Lyndhurst, Mayfield Heights, and Gates Mills, continuing on as Mayfield until the Geauga County/Ashtabula County line.

In Geauga County, US 322 passes through suburban Chester Township and into Ohio's second largest Amish community, which includes the rural townships of Claridon, Huntsburg, Windsor Township and the west side of Orwell Township. In Ashtabula County, US 322 crosses through Windsor Township, Orwell Township, the village of Orwell, Colebrook Township, Wayne Township and Williamsfield Township before crossing the Ohio-Pennsylvania state line south of Pymatuning Reservoir.

Pennsylvania

US 322 enters Pennsylvania from Ohio in West Shenango Township. From this point, the road continues east, forming a concurrency with U.S. Route 6 between Conneaut Lake and Meadville, interchanging with Interstate 79 and intersecting U.S. Route 19 in Meadville. In Franklin, the route crosses U.S. Route 62. Continuing east, US 322 interchanges with Interstate 80 near Clarion before meeting U.S. Route 119 and U.S. Route 219 south of DuBois. US 322 heads southeast as a surface road before merging onto the Interstate 99/U.S. Route 220 freeway in Port Matilda, following that east to State College. The US 322 freeway continues past I-99 before ending to the east of State College. Near Potters Mills, US 322 becomes a freeway again and intersects U.S. Route 22 and U.S. Route 522 in Lewistown, forming a long concurrency with the former.

The US 22/US 322 freeway continues across the Appalachian Mountains, meeting U.S. Route 11/U.S. Route 15 prior to crossing the Susquehanna River by way of the Clarks Ferry Bridge. The road continues south along the east bank of the river to Harrisburg, where US 322 splits from US 22 by heading east onto Interstate 81 and then south onto Interstate 83. At the interchange between I-83 and the northern terminus of Interstate 283, US 322 turns east and heads to Hershey, intersecting U.S. Route 422. From this point, US 322 heads southeast through the Pennsylvania Dutch Country, intersecting U.S. Route 222 at a diverging diamond interchange near Ephrata. In Downingtown, the route crosses U.S. Route 30 before heading to West Chester. Here, US 322 bypasses the town and merges onto a freeway alignment along with U.S. Route 202 that ends to the south of West Chester. US 322 follows US 202 until Painters Crossing, where it turns east onto U.S. Route 1. In Concordville, US 322 splits from US 1 and heads southeast to Chester. In Chester, the route forms a brief concurrency with Interstate 95 before heading southeast and interchanging with U.S. Route 13 prior to the Commodore Barry Bridge over the Delaware River.

New Jersey

US 322 enters New Jersey via the Commodore Barry Bridge just north of Delaware and interchanges with Interstate 295 and the New Jersey Turnpike before entering historic Mullica Hill, New Jersey. In Glassboro, it bisects Rowan University. At Williamstown, US 322 goes onto the Black Horse Pike (picking up where Route 42 ends) and follows it the rest of the way to Atlantic City, being concurrent with U.S. Route 40 from Mays Landing on east.  In the 1960s and 1970s, the New Jersey Department of Transportation (NJDOT) had planned for a freeway bypass of U.S. Route 322 around Glassboro.  Later it was planned as a New Jersey Turnpike extension, but all plans were dropped due to budget cuts and mounting opposition.

Major intersections
Ohio
  / Public Square in Cleveland. US 6/US 322 travels concurrently through Cleveland.
  in Cleveland
  in Cleveland. The highways travel concurrently through Cleveland.
  in Mayfield Heights
Pennsylvania
  in Conneaut Lake. The highways travel concurrently to Meadville.
  south-southwest of Fredericksburg. The highways travel concurrently to Meadville.
  in Fredericksburg
  in Franklin. The highways travel concurrently through Franklin.
  west of Corsica
  south-southwest of Sandy
  south-southeast of Sandy. The highways travel concurrently to Luthersburg.
  north-northwest of Port Matilda. The highways travel concurrently to Pennsylvania State University west of Houserville.
  in Highland Park. US 22/US 322 travels concurrently to Harrisburg. US 322/US 22 travels concurrently to Lewistown as well. 
  north-northeast of Duncannon
  in Harrisburg. I-81/US 322 travels concurrently to the Progress–Colonial Park CDP line.
  on the Progress–Colonial Park CDP line. I-83/US 322 travels concurrently to west of Lawnton.
  on the Progress–Colonial Park CDP line
  in Hershey
  southeast of Ephrata
  west-northwest of Downingtown
  northeast of West Chester. The highways travel concurrently to west-southwest of Concordville.
  west-southwest of Concordville. US 1/US 322 travels concurrently to Concordville.
  in Chester. The highways travel concurrently through Chester.
  in Chester
New Jersey
  in Bridgeport
  south-southeast of Bridgeport
  in McKee City. The highways travel concurrently to Atlantic City.
  in Pleasantville
 Atlantic Avenue / Pacific Avenue in Atlantic City

See also

References

External links

 
22-3
22-3
U.S. Route 322
Transportation in Cuyahoga County, Ohio
Transportation in Geauga County, Ohio
Transportation in Ashtabula County, Ohio
3